Four Dimensions of Greta is a 1972 British sex comedy film directed and produced by Pete Walker, featuring four 3-D film sequences. It was the first British film to use 3-D, and the tagline on the poster read, "A girl in your lap". The film is also known as The Three Dimensions of Greta.

Plot
Hans, a young German journalist arrives in London to write an article about au pair girls but is requested by friends to investigate the whereabouts of their teenage daughter Greta.  He interviews four individuals who all paint distinctly different pictures of the missing girl - each revealing a different aspect or dimension. These reminiscences constitute the film's 3-D sequences.  Hans finally tracks down Greta and discovers she has been kidnapped by an East End gangster.

Cast
Hans Weimar ...	Tristan Rogers
Sue ...	Karen Boyes
Carl Roberts ...	Alan Curtis
Greta Gruber ...	Leena Skoog
Roger Maidment ...	Robin Askwith
Big Danny ...	Bill Maynard
Percy ...	 Kenneth Hendel
Schikler ...	Martin Wyldeck
Hotel Porter ...	Ivor Salter
Frau Gruber ...	Pearl Hackney
Phil the Greek ...	John Clive
Johnny Maltese ...	Nik Zaran
Mrs Marks ...	Carole Allen
Fred Sharprock ...	Ralph Ball
Footballer ...	Derek Keller
Frau Schikler ...	Elizabeth Bradley
American Woman ...	Marion Grimaldi
Gruber ...	Godfrey Kenton
Manchester Businessman ...	Tom Mennard
Karen Gruber ...	Erika Raffael
Policeman ...	Max Mason
Serena ...	 Felicity Devonshire
Villain ...	Steve Emerson
Kirsten ...	Jane Cardew
Cyn ...	 Minah Bird
Policeman ...	Mike Stevens
Degenerate ...	Richard O'Brien
Police Sergeant ...	Les Clark
Hippie ...	Steve Patterson
Hippie ...	Mike Brittain
Waiter ...	Pete Walker

Production

Filming locations
The film was shot on location in London, England and Berlin, Germany.

Music
The music was composed and conducted by Harry South.

Release

Critical response
The Spinning Image wrote, "thrusting a banana at the camera is evidently not as erotic as director Pete Walker might have hoped."
The Digital Fix noted an "amusingly daft sex film" 
DVD Drive-in said, "although the title boasts "3-dimensional," the characters are almost all 1-dimensional...Only Robin Askwith (star of Horror Hospital and numerous "Confessions" and "Carry On" flicks) turns in a memorable performance as a shabby footballer romantically tied to Greta."

Home media

References

External links
 

British 3D films
British independent films
1972 films
Films directed by Pete Walker
British sex comedy films
Sexploitation films
1970s sex comedy films
1972 comedy films
Dimension Pictures films
1970s English-language films
1972 independent films
1970s 3D films
1970s British films